Florida Airport  is a defunct airport near Florida, a municipality in the province of Camagüey in Cuba.

Facilities

History
At this place was already an airfield in the 1940s. It was used to house small airplanes used in agriculture to spray crops with insecticides. In the 1970s, the plane field was paved and given the name Santiago Tomas del Sol Flores, a Cuban pilot who was killed in Mozambique. Small aircraft of the type PZL Mielec M-18 Dromader and AN-2 were based there.

Soon after the collapse of the Soviet Union, operations came to a halt and the remaining aircraft were transferred to the larger airport at Camaguey.

References

External links
 

Airports in Cuba
Airport
Buildings and structures in Camagüey Province